Raithalawela ( Sinhala: රයිතලාවෙල ) is a village in Sri Lanka. It is located within Central Province.
 Province - Central Province
 District - Matale
 Pradeshiya Sabha (local government) - Ukuwela

See also
List of towns in Central Province, Sri Lanka

External links

Populated places in Matale District